Alice Gulick may refer to:
 Alice Gordon Gulick, American missionary teacher in Spain
 Alice Walbridge Gulick, American teacher, hospital matron, and Christian missionary